Dhola Junction railway station is a major railway station serving in Bhavnagar district of Gujarat State of India. It serves Dhola town. It is under Bhavnagar railway division of Western Railway zone of Indian Railways. Dhola Junction railway station is 49 km away from Bhavnagar Terminus. Passenger, Express and Superfast trains halt here.

Trains 

The following trains halt at Dhola Junction railway station in both directions:

 12945/46 Surat–Mahuva Superfast Express
 22993/94 Bandra Terminus–Mahuva Superfast Express
 22989/90 Bandra Terminus–Mahuva Express
 22935/36 Bandra Terminus–Palitana Express
 12941/42 Parasnath Express
 19259/60 Kochuveli–Bhavnagar Express
 12971/72 Bandra Terminus–Bhavnagar Terminus Express
 22963/64 Bandra Terminus–Bhavnagar Terminus Weekly Superfast Express
 19107/08 Bhavnagar Terminus–Udhampur Janmabhoomi Express
 19579/80 Bhavnagar Terminus–Delhi Sarai Rohilla Link Express

See also
Bhavnagar State Railway

References

Railway stations in Bhavnagar district
Bhavnagar railway division
Railway junction stations in Gujarat